Million Dollar Arm is a 2014 American biographical sports drama film directed by Craig Gillespie and produced by Walt Disney Pictures from a screenplay written by Tom McCarthy. The film is based on the true story of baseball pitchers Rinku Singh and Dinesh Patel who were discovered by sports agent J. B. Bernstein after winning a reality show competition.

The film stars Jon Hamm as J. B. Bernstein, Bill Paxton as pitching coach Tom House, Suraj Sharma as Singh, Madhur Mittal as Patel, and Alan Arkin. The film's music is composed by A. R. Rahman. Produced by Joe Roth, Mark Ciardi, and Gordon Gray, the film was released theatrically on May 16, 2014. Million Dollar Arm grossed $39.2 million.

Plot

J. B. Bernstein is a big-time sports agent who, along with his partner Ash Vasudevan, recently formed their own company. Unfortunately, all of J. B.'s clients have retired, and he is unable to reel in star football player Popo Vanuatu. Desperate to find new clients, J. B. realizes India, with over one billion people, has real potential for untapped baseball talent. He approaches investor Mr. Chang with his proposal—a talent contest staged in India called "Million Dollar Arm." Contestants score points by demonstrating they can pitch a baseball with speed and accuracy. Along with the prize money, two winners will be flown to the U.S. and receive coaching to become legitimate baseball prospects within two years. Chang commits to providing the funding, on the condition the prospects are ready within only one year. With no alternative, J. B. reluctantly assures Chang the winners will be ready for a major-league try-out within one year.

J. B. approaches veteran baseball pitching coach Tom House who explains that cricket, the main sport played in India, and baseball have very different motions for bowling and pitching, and getting a good recruit ready for a try-out in one year is extremely unlikely, if not impossible. J. B. points how House has nothing to lose and everything to gain by taking up the challenge, and House agrees.

While Ash and Theresa, their assistant, hold down the fort in Los Angeles, J. B. flies to India. Despite support from Vivek, his guide in India, J. B. is bewildered by the traffic, the overcrowding, and the lax way Indians conduct business. He is joined by the curmudgeonly Ray Poitevint, a longtime major league scout, and hires Amit Rohan as his interpreter. After lengthy try-outs in numerous cities, two youngsters emerge as the winners — Rinku Singh and Dinesh Patel, and they are flown to the U.S. to begin their baseball training. The pair, who grew up in poverty in India and do not speak or understand English, are instantly overwhelmed by the sights and sounds of America, although Rinku immediately develops a liking for pizza. Things soon come to a crunch when they are detained by hotel security for messing with elevator emergency controls, inadvertently getting themselves stuck and setting off the fire alarm. J. B. is subsequently forced to invite them to stay at his home. For their baseball training, J. B. dumps the pair by House and his staff while he runs off to close more deals. In being treated so, the pair feels like social outcasts. J. B.'s tenant Brenda Fenwick is the only person who genuinely seems interested in their well-being.

When J. B. takes the boys and Amit to a party thrown by Popo, whom J. B. hopes to sign, things get worse when Amit gets drunk after accidentally drinking a margarita mistaking it for punch while Rinku becomes sick from overeating and as a result, both vomit on J. B.'s windshield, forcing an enraged J. B. to drive them home, and forfeit the deal with Popo, who signed with someone else. Brenda calms him down and makes him realize he is treating the two boys like a business deal. The next day, J. B., no longer able to afford the payments on his Porsche, trades it in for a Dodge Caravan and joins the boys for their prayers. Ignoring J. B.'s pleas of the two boys' lack of readiness, Chang insists his terms be fulfilled and the boys demonstrate their baseball skills one year from the time they arrived in the US. ESPN, Sports Illustrated, and local media are joined by numerous major-league scouts to watch the boys pitch. The try-out is a complete disaster, as the pair is both very nervous and pitch without speed or control, failing to impress anyone. Chang is happy with Million Dollar arm success, but the two boys are done.

Brenda convinces J. B. that the boys be given another try-out. Chang refused to go along with it, and no scouts are interested in wasting their time on another fiasco. All hope is lost until Ray arranges for J. B. to meet the Pittsburgh Pirates head scout who was away in Puerto Rico for the first try-out, and agrees to come. Chang changes his mind and sees the second try-out of Singh and Patel. This time, J. B. insists the boys relax and have fun. The scouts are quickly impressed as the pair consistently deliver 90+ mph fastballs thrown accurately, and both are offered a contract by the Pittsburgh Pirates.

Cast

 Jon Hamm as J.B.
 Aasif Mandvi as Ash
 Bill Paxton as Tom House
 Suraj Sharma as Rinku
 Lake Bell as Brenda
 Alan Arkin as Ray Poitevint
 Madhur Mittal as Dinesh
 Pitobash Tripathy as Amit Rohan (Deepesh Solanki)
 Tzi Ma as Chang
 Darshan Jariwala as Vivek
 Greg Alan Williams as Doug
 Allyn Rachel as Theresa
 Rey Maualuga as Popo

ESPN personalities Jayson Stark, Karl Ravech, and Steve Levy, journalist Ken Rosenthal, and retired Major League Baseball players Barry Larkin and Curt Schilling have cameo appearances in the film.

Production
In 2008, television sports producers and brothers Neil and Michael Mandt began documenting the training and tryouts that Singh and Patel were undergoing at the USC campus. Using original footage they had shot, they created a nine-minute trailer as a presentation piece for a projected movie about the two players. In December 2008, the Mandts began a collaboration with producers Mark Ciardi, Gordon Gray and Joe Roth. In early 2009, the screen rights to Singh and Patel's life story were purchased by Sony Pictures Entertainment for development at Columbia Pictures, which hired Mitch Glazer to write a screenplay.

The project was eventually put in turnaround and in 2010, producers Roth and Ciardi set the film up at Walt Disney Pictures. Upon acquiring the film, Disney hired Tom McCarthy to write a script. In May 2012, Jon Hamm was hired to play J. B. Bernstein. Alan Arkin and Suraj Sharma were hired in April 2013, with Allyn Rachel joining the cast the following month. Principal photography began on May 30, 2013 with filming taking place in Mumbai, Atlanta, and Los Angeles.

Music

A. R. Rahman composed the film's score. The soundtrack album was digitally released by Walt Disney Records on May 13, 2014 whereas the CD release was released on May 19, 2014.

Release
The first trailer was released on December 23, 2013 and attached theatrically with Saving Mr. Banks. Disney heavily promoted the film through its ESPN division, with Bill Simmons being credited an executive producer on the film. The film was fully screened at CinemaCon in March 2014, wherein Walt Disney Studios chairman Alan Horn claimed that it was the highest-tested film during his tenure at either Disney or Warner Bros., including the first Harry Potter film. The film held its world premiere at the El Capitan Theatre on May 6, 2014.

Home media
Million Dollar Arm was released by Walt Disney Studios Home Entertainment on Blu-ray Disc and DVD on October 7, 2014.

Reception

Box office
Million Dollar Arm grossed $36.5 million in North America and $2.8 million in other territories for a total gross of $39.2 million, against a budget of $25 million.

In its opening weekend, the film grossed $10.5 million, finishing in fourth place at the box office behind fellow new release Godzilla ($95.1 million), as well as Neighbors ($25.2 million) and The Amazing Spider-Man 2 ($16.8 million).

Critical response

The film review aggregator website Rotten Tomatoes reports that prior to release Million Dollar Arm received a 64% approval rating from critics, based on 149 reviews with an average score of 6.00/10. The site's consensus reads: "Pleasant to a fault, Million Dollar Arm is a middle-of-the-plate pitch that coasts on Jon Hamm's considerable charm without adding any truly original curves to Disney's inspirational sports formula." Metacritic gave the film a score of 56 out of 100, based on 38 critics, indicating "mixed or average reviews". Audiences polled by CinemaScore gave the film an average grade of "A−" on an A+ to F scale.

Scott Foundas of Variety described the film as a "sharp, slickly produced addition to the Disney sports movie canon [that] works as both a stirring underdog tale and as a revealing look at the expanding global footprint of the American sports-entertainment machine." Foundas also praised McCarthy's screenplay and Gillespie's direction, elaborating that they "put across the movie's many cliches with a certain verve, and find room for unexpected detours and grace notes in an overall familiar trajectory." Michael Rechtshaffen of The Hollywood Reporter wrote, "Dutifully covering all the requisite inspirational sports movie/fish-out-of-water bases yet still managing to throw a few fresh curves into the mix, Disney's Million Dollar Arm assuredly hits a home run." Chris Nashawaty of Entertainment Weekly gave the film a "B−" grade, comparing it to Jerry Maguire, and calling Hamm's performance as one of film's highlights.

Alonso Duralde of The Wrap criticized the film's predictability and excessive sentimentality.

The Academy of Motion Picture Arts and Sciences placed Million Dollar Arm on its shortlist of potential nominees for the Academy Award for Best Original Score and Best Original Song (for "Million Dollar Dream", "Spreading the Word/Makhna", and "We Could Be Kings"), but ultimately was not nominated for either award.

Accolades

See also

References

External links
  at Disney.com
 
 
 
 
 Call-in web radio show with Dinesh Patel, Rinku Singh and JB Bernstein, November 2008

2014 films
2014 biographical drama films
2010s sports drama films
American baseball films
American biographical drama films
American sports drama films
2010s Hindi-language films
Baseball in India
Biographical films about sportspeople
Films about competitions
Films about cricket in India
Films set in 2008
Films set in Los Angeles
Films set in Malibu, California
Films set in Mumbai
Films shot in Atlanta
Films shot in Los Angeles
Films shot in Mumbai
Sports films based on actual events
Walt Disney Pictures films
Films directed by Craig Gillespie
Films scored by A. R. Rahman
Films produced by Joe Roth
Films shot in India
Cultural depictions of Indian men
Cultural depictions of baseball players
2014 drama films
2010s English-language films
2010s American films
Films about Major League Baseball